Sayed Rahmatullah Hashemi is a former envoy of the Islamic Emirate of Afghanistan. 'Sayed' is an honorific title that indicates lineage with the family of the Banu Hashem. He later attended Yale University as a non-degree student, but his application to the bachelor degree program was rejected after condemnation from American conservatives.

Biography 
Rahmatullah was born in Afghanistan, to Pashtun parents. In mid 1980s, his family moved to Pakistan. Rahmatullah grew up in Pakistan and was educated in the Pakistani school system. His schooling was fragmented, but he did emerge proficient in English as well as Pashto, Persian, and Urdu.

In 1994, Rahmatullah worked as a computer operator and translator at the zonal sub-office of Afghanistan's Ministry of Foreign Affairs in Kandahar. He was appointed to the position of diplomat in the Afghan Embassy in Islamabad, Pakistan in 1998. In this capacity, he traveled around the world as an envoy of the Afghan Foreign Ministry of the Taliban regime. When top Taliban leaders were banned from foreign travel, Rahmatullah acted as representative of the regime on foreign visits.

Yale attendance controversy 
In 2004, an American friend, Mike Hoover—a CBS cameraman who had sponsored his 2001 trip—suggested applying to college in the US. In 2005, Rahmatullah was admitted to Yale as a non degree student. In 2006, conservative sentiment arose opposing Rahmatullah studying at Yale University and questioning outright his presence in the United States.

As of April 2006, Yale has published the following comment on its website:

 Yale has allowed Mr. Hashemi to take courses for college credit in a part-time program that does not award Yale degrees... We hope that his courses help him understand the broader context for the conflicts around the world... According to the State Department, Ramatullah Hashemi was issued U.S. visas in 2004 and 2005, first on a tourist visa and then in 2005 on a student visa. The mandatory procedures were followed, which, in his case, included vetting through an interagency security clearance process. He was cleared by all agencies."

A recent non-scientific poll conducted by the Yale Herald—a student-run weekly newspaper—which was answered by 2,000 undergrads, concluded that 50% of Yale supported Hashmi's acceptance and about 25% opposed it.

In July 2006, Rahmatullah was denied admission to the Eli Whitney Students Program, Yale's degree-granting program for non-traditional students.

References

External links 
Transcript

"You've Got Mail (It's From Yale): A university official calls Taliban critics "retarded" while the university maintains a stony silence", Wall Street Journal, 13 March 2006
Ivory Tower Stonewall: A 9/11 survivor asks Yale to explain why it admitted the Taliban Man, Wall Street Journal, 3 April 2006

1978 births
Afghan diplomats
Living people
Pashtun people
Taliban members
Yale University alumni
Afghan emigrants to Pakistan
People from Quetta
Hashemite people
Afghan people of Arab descent